An anastomosis (plural anastomoses) is a connection or opening between two things (especially cavities or passages) that are normally diverging or branching, such as between blood vessels, leaf veins, or streams. Such a connection may be normal (such as the foramen ovale in a fetus's heart) or abnormal (such as the patent foramen ovale in an adult's heart); it may be acquired (such as an arteriovenous fistula) or innate (such as the arteriovenous shunt of a metarteriole); and it may be natural (such as the aforementioned examples) or artificial (such as a surgical anastomosis). The reestablishment of an anastomosis that had become blocked is called a reanastomosis. Anastomoses that are abnormal, whether congenital or acquired, are often called fistulas.

The term is used in medicine, biology, mycology, geology, and geography.

Etymology
Anastomosis: medical or Modern Latin, from Greek ἀναστόμωσις, anastomosis, "outlet, opening", Gr ana- "up, on, upon", stoma "mouth", "to furnish with a mouth". Thus the -stom- syllable is cognate with that of stoma in botany or stoma in medicine.

Medical anatomy

An anastomosis is the connection of two normally divergent structures. It refers to connections between blood vessels or between other tubular structures such as loops of intestine.

Circulatory
In circulatory anastomoses, many arteries naturally anastomose with each other; for example, the inferior epigastric artery and superior epigastric artery, or the anterior and/or posterior communicating arteries in the Circle of Willis in the brain. The circulatory anastomosis is further divided into arterial and venous anastomosis. Arterial anastomosis includes actual arterial anastomosis (e.g., palmar arch, plantar arch) and potential arterial anastomosis (e.g. coronary arteries and cortical branch of cerebral arteries). Anastomoses also form alternative routes around capillary beds in areas that don't need a large blood supply, thus helping regulate systemic blood flow.

Surgical
Surgical anastomosis occurs when segments of intestine, blood vessel, or any other structure are connected together surgically (anastomosed). Examples include arterial anastomosis in bypass surgery, intestinal anastomosis after a piece of intestine has been resected, Roux-en-Y anastomosis and ureteroureterostomy.  Surgical anastomosis techniques include Linear Stapled Anastomosis, Hand Sewn Anastomosis, End-to-End Anastomosis (EEA). Anastomosis can be performed by hand or with an anastomosis assist device. Studies have been performed comparing various anastomosis approaches taking into account surgical "time and cost, postoperative anastomotic bleeding, leakage, and stricture".

Pathological
Pathological anastomosis results from trauma or disease and may involve veins, arteries, or intestines. These are usually referred to as fistulas. In the cases of veins or arteries, traumatic fistulas usually occur between artery and vein. Traumatic intestinal fistulas usually occur between two loops of intestine (entero-enteric fistula) or intestine and skin (enterocutaneous fistula). Portacaval anastomosis, by contrast, is an anastomosis between a vein of the portal circulation and a vein of the systemic circulation, which allows blood to bypass the liver in patients with portal hypertension, often resulting in hemorrhoids, esophageal varices, or caput medusae.

Biology

Evolution
In evolution, anastomosis is a recombination of evolutionary lineage. Conventional accounts of evolutionary lineage present themselves as the branching out of species into novel forms.  Under anastomosis, species might recombine after initial branching out, such as in the case of recent research that shows that ancestral populations along human and chimpanzee lineages may have interbred after an initial branching event. The concept of anastomosis also applies to the theory of symbiogenesis, in which new species emerge from the formation of novel symbiotic relationships.

Mycology
In mycology, anastomosis is the fusion between branches of the same or different hyphae. Hence the bifurcating fungal hyphae can form true reticulating networks. By sharing materials in the form of dissolved ions, hormones, and nucleotides, the fungus maintains bidirectional communication with itself. The fungal network might begin from several origins; several spores (i.e. by means of conidial anastomosis tubes), several points of penetration, each a spreading circumference of absorption and assimilation. Once encountering the tip of another expanding, exploring self, the tips press against each other in pheromonal recognition or by an unknown recognition system, fusing to form a genetic singular clonal colony that can cover hectares called a genet or just microscopical areas.

For fungi, anastomosis is also a component of reproduction. In some fungi, two different haploid mating types – if compatible – merge. Somatically, they form a morphologically similar mycelial wave front that continues to grow and explore. The significant difference is that each septated unit is binucleate, containing two unfused nuclei, i.e. one from each parent that eventually undergoes karyogamy and meiosis to complete the sexual cycle.

Also the term "anastomosing" is used for mushroom gills which interlink and separate to form a network.

Botany 

The growth of a strangler fig around a host tree, with tendrils fusing together to form a mesh, is called anastomosing.

Geology
In geology, anastomosis refers to quartz (or other) veins displaying this property, which is often related to shearing in metamorphic regions.

Geography

Anastomosing streams consist of multiple channels that divide and reconnect and are separated by semi-permanent banks formed of cohesive material, such that they are unlikely to migrate from one channel position to another. They can be confused with braided rivers based on their planforms alone, but braided rivers are much shallower and more dynamic than anastomosing rivers. Some definitions require that an anastomosing river be made up of interconnected channels that enclose floodbasins, again in contrast with braided rivers. Rivers with anastomosed reaches include the Magdalena River in Colombia, the upper Columbia River in British Columbia, Canada, the Drumheller Channels of the Channeled Scablands of the state of Washington, USA, and the upper Narew River in Poland. The term anabranch has been used for segments of anastamosing rivers.

In cave systems anastomosis is the splitting of cave passages that later reconnect.

References

Angiology
Digestive system
Evolutionary biology
Petrology
Surgery